Edward John Anthony Rutkowski (born March 21, 1941) is a former American football player, and a former politician in Buffalo, New York. Rutkowski was a noted college and professional American football player. A wide receiver, he was an American Football League All-Star in 1965, playing for the AFL's Buffalo Bills as a receiver, defensive back, punt and kickoff return man and backup quarterback from 1963 to 1968.  In a famous Topps football card mixup, Rutkowski was shown on two Buffalo Bills' football cards, his own, and mistakenly on the card for Ray Abruzzese. Rutkowski closed out his Pro Football career by playing seven games as a backup quarterback with the Montreal Alouettes of the Canadian Football League in 1969. From 1972-78 and again in 1990, Rutkowski served as a color commentator on the Bills' radio broadcasts. In 1979, he became the County Executive of Erie County, New York, succeeding Edward Regan, who stepped down to become New York State Comptroller. Rutkowski was elected to full terms in 1979 and 1983, following his one year unexpired term, for a total of nine years in office. In 1987, Rutkowski was defeated for reelection by Assemblyman Dennis Gorski.

In 1995, Rutkowski was appointed by Governor George Pataki as deputy commissioner of the New York State Office of Parks, Recreation and Historic Preservation. In this post, he was charge of all state parks and recreations operations in Western New York, including Niagara Falls. He held the post for 12 years, until Pataki left office.

He was the fourth quarterback from a Buffalo professional football team to enter politics, following his teammate Jack Kemp, George Ratterman and Tommy Hughitt. Incidentally, both Kemp and Rutkowski were Republicans.

He is of Polish origin.

See also
 List of American Football League players

References

1941 births
Living people
American athlete-politicians
American Football League All-Star players
American football wide receivers
Buffalo Bills announcers
Buffalo Bills players
Erie County Executives
New York (state) Republicans
National Football League announcers
Notre Dame Fighting Irish football players
American politicians of Polish descent
Players of American football from Buffalo, New York
People from Kingston, Pennsylvania
Players of American football from Pennsylvania
American Football League players